The AfriPop Project, is a non-profit project primarily funded by the Fondation Philippe Wiener - Maurice Anspach Foundation. AfriPop represents a collaboration between the University of Florida, United States, the Université libre de Bruxelles, Belgium and the Malaria Public Health & Epidemiology Group, Centre for Geographic Medicine, Kenya. The project is currently headed by Dr. Andrew Tatem and Dr. Catherine Linard.

High resolution, contemporary data on human population distributions are a prerequisite for the accurate measurement of the impacts of population growth, for monitoring changes and for planning interventions. The AfriPop project was initiated in July 2009 with an aim of producing detailed and freely-available population distribution maps for the whole of sub-Saharan Africa.

The AfriPop team have assembled a unique spatial database of linked information on contemporary census data across Africa, satellite-imagery derived settlement maps and land cover information. Novel approaches to extracting detailed spatial data on settlements from satellite imagery  have been combined with contemporary detailed census data and land cover to map population densities across sub-Saharan Africa at unprecedented levels of detail. The resultant maps are freely available from the project website.

See also
Africa,
World Population,
Malaria Atlas Project

References

External links
 WorldPop—official website

AfriPop Project, The
Organizations based in Gainesville, Florida
Demographics of Africa
University of Florida
Université libre de Bruxelles